ORP Jaskółka was the lead ship of her class of minesweepers in the Polish Navy at the outset of World War II. Jaskółka was sunk during the Nazi invasion of 1939.

History
Jaskółka was built at Gdynia; launched 11 September 1934; and commissioned 27 August 1935.

On 1 September 1939, Jaskółka under the command of captain Tadeusz Borysiewicz, along with other minesweepers, engaged in combat with German aircraft on their way to execute a bombing raid of the Hel Peninsula, in what became known as the Battle of the Gdańsk Bay. During the battle, sister ship  was damaged. On the night of 12 September, Jaskółka and  fired upon German positions. During the next two days, the same ships installed mines around the Hel peninsula to keep German ships from bombarding the defenders. On 14 September, Jaskółka was sunk after it was hit by a German bomb in the port of Jastarnia.

References

Further reading 
 
 

Jaskółka-class minesweepers
Ships built in Gdynia
1934 ships
Ships sunk by German aircraft
World War II shipwrecks in the Baltic Sea
Maritime incidents in September 1939
Shipwrecks of Poland